The 1968 Western Michigan Broncos football team represented Western Michigan University in the Mid-American Conference (MAC) during the 1968 NCAA University Division football season.  In their fifth season under head coach Bill Doolittle, the Broncos compiled a 3–6 record (2–4 against MAC opponents), finished in fifth place in the MAC, and were outscored by their opponents, 191 to 160.  The team played its home games at Waldo Stadium in Kalamazoo, Michigan.

The team's statistical leaders included Mark Boudeaux with 1,143 passing yards, Ken Woodside with 474 rushing yards, and Al Bellile with 394 receiving yards. Defensive end Jerry Collins and fullback Tim Majerle were the team captains. Defensive back Dave Hudson received the team's most outstanding player award.

Schedule

References

Western Michigan
Western Michigan Broncos football seasons
Western Michigan Broncos football